Charles Joseph Wilson II (born July 1, 1968) is a former professional American football wide receiver in the National Football League (NFL). He played for six seasons for the Green Bay Packers (1990–1991), the Tampa Bay Buccaneers (1992–1994), and the New York Jets (1995). Wilson also played for the Tampa Bay Storm of the Arena Football League (AFL).

External links
NFL.com player page

1968 births
Living people
Players of American football from Tallahassee, Florida
American football wide receivers
Memphis Tigers football players
Green Bay Packers players
Tampa Bay Buccaneers players
New York Jets players
Tampa Bay Storm players